Sherwood Court is a short sloping road between St Georges Terrace in Perth, Western Australia and The Esplanade with Allendale Square on the upper corner, and Lawson Apartments on the lower.

It sits across from London Court and allows pedestrian access between the central business district and The Esplanade and Perth foreshore. Its context has been taken into consideration in planning of the Perth foreshore development in that it is claimed that planned structures on The Esplanade will not block the view to Perth Water.

The images of former buildings on the St Georges Terrace corner provide context to the early architecture now lost.

The Cecil Building at number 6 was frequently photographed, as was Sherwood House.

During the second world war, various offices of services relating to the war effort were housed in Sherwood Court and before offices were made elsewhere, sections of the Perth Road Board were located there as well.
The Atlas Building, although facing the Esplanade, takes up the south western side of the street across from the Lawson Apartments.

The Allendale Square and Exchange Plaza buildings now take up considerable space of former structures in the street.

Intersections

References

Streets in Perth central business district, Western Australia